Indonesia national under-21 football team represents Indonesia in association football and has players aged 21 years old or under.

Coaches

Tournament record

Hassanal Bolkiah Trophy

Exhibition

External links

  The official Indonesian football association website

under-21
Asian national under-21 association football teams